Andrew William Scott (13 February 1960 – 3 September 2006) was an Australian cricketer.  Scott was a right-handed batsman who bowled right-arm fast-medium.  He was born in Geelong, Victoria.

Scott made his debut for Durham against Hertfordshire in the 1985 Minor Counties Championship.  He played Minor counties cricket for Durham only in the 1985 season, making 6 Minor Counties Championship appearances and 4 MCCA Knockout Trophy appearances. He made his List A debut against Derbyshire in the 1985 NatWest Trophy.  He bowled 8 wicket-less overs for the cost of 29 runs in this match, while with the bat he wasn't called upon, with Durham winning against their first-class opponents by 7 wickets. He made a further List A appearance against Kent in the following round of the same competition. In this match, he took the wickets of Mark Benson and Alan Knott for the cost of 45 runs from 10 overs, while with the bat he was dismissed for 7 runs by Derek Underwood, with Kent winning by 79 runs.

He died in Corio, Victoria on 3 September 2006.

References

External links
Andrew Scott at ESPNcricinfo
Andrew Scott at CricketArchive

1960 births
2006 deaths
Australian cricketers
Durham cricketers
Cricketers from Geelong